Adscita jordani is a moth of the family Zygaenidae. It is found in Portugal and Spain (except the north-east and the Pyrenees).

The length of the forewings is 10–11.5 mm for males and 10–11 mm for females. Adults are on wing from April to August.

Etymology
It is named for Karl Jordan.

References

C. M. Naumann, W. G. Tremewan: The Western Palaearctic Zygaenidae. Apollo Books, Stenstrup 1999,

External links

The Barcode of Life Data Systems (BOLD) 

Procridinae
Moths described in 1921
Moths of Europe